Sweet Noise is a Polish alternative metal band. The group was formed in 1990 in Swarzędz. They have released eight CDs (included two international versions) and appeared three times at the Przystanek Woodstock festival with the special show in 2003 when more than 400,000 people watched the culmination of what the band refers to as conceptual art of Revolta White Shock. The leader and creator of the band is Peter "Glaca" Mohamed. Mohamed is the singer, musician, performer, producer and conceptual artist. He developed an experimental, multimedia project Noise Inc.. He is also involved in project Serce with Toshi Kasai and M.T.void which is a musical outfit run by Mohamed and Justin Chancellor, the bass player of Tool.

Discography

Studio albums

Video albums

Music videos

References

External links
 

Polish rock music groups
Alternative metal musical groups